The Bachelorette Australia is a reality television adaptation of the U.S. series of the same name, and a spin-off of The Bachelor Australia. The series, hosted by Osher Günsberg, premiered on 23 September 2015 on Network 10.

It was announced in November 2015 that unlike season 1 which was produced by Shine Australia, seasons 2–present would be produced by Warner Bros. International Television Production.

In June 2022, it was announced the series would not be returning to Network 10 in 2022, however it could return in the future.

Premise
The series revolves around a single bachelorette and a pool of romantic interests. The conflicts in the series, both internal and external, stem from the elimination-style format of the show. Early in the season, the bachelorette goes on large group dates with the contestants, with the majority of sutors eliminated. As the season progresses, contestants are also eliminated on single dates and on elimination two-on-one dates. The process culminates with hometown visits to the families of the final contestants, overnight dates, should they choose to accept, at exotic locations with the final three contestants, and interaction with the bachelorette's family with the final two contestants.

Most seasons of the show are heterosexual-centric (a female seeking a male partner), however, the 7th season of the show features a bisexual bachelorette courting both male and female contestants.

Elimination process

Single date
The bachelorette and one contestant go on a date. The bachelorette is given a chance to get to know the contestant on a more personal level, and the dates are usually very intimate. If the date goes well and the bachelorette wishes to spend more time with the contestant or get to know them further, she may present them with a rose at the date. This means that during the rose ceremony at the end of each episode, they will be safe and there will be no chance of them going home.

Group date
The bachelorette and a group of contestants participate in an activity. Sometimes the activity takes the form of a competition, with the winner or winners spending more time with the bachelorette. The bachelorette typically presents a rose to the contestant who makes the best impression during the group date.

Rose ceremony
The contestants who have not been eliminated stand in rows at one end of the room, and the bachelorette faces them. The bachelorette has a tray with roses. The bachelorette takes a rose and calls a contestant by name. The contestant steps forward, and the bachelorette asks, "Will you accept this rose?" The contestant accepts, takes the rose, and makes his way to the other side of the room (where all the contestants who have been given a rose are required to stand.) After all roses are distributed, the host tells the contestants who did not receive a rose to "please take a moment now to say your good-byes."

Hometown visits
The bachelorette visits the hometowns and families of each of the four remaining contestants. At the rose ceremony, one person is eliminated, leaving three. Another episode airs before the final rose ceremony, leaving two contestants.

The finale
The two remaining contestants separately meet with the bachelorette's family. At the end of the episode, the bachelorette will reveal their true love to the person of her choice. That contestant is said to be the winner of The Bachelorette Australia.

Seasons

Ratings

Awards and nominations

References

Network 10 original programming
2015 Australian television series debuts
2010s Australian reality television series
Australian dating and relationship reality television series
English-language television shows
Television shows set in New South Wales
Television series by Endemol Australia
Television series by Warner Bros. Television Studios
Australian TV series
Australian television series based on American television series
2020s Australian reality television series